Himalaya: Mountains of Life is a coffee table book authored by Sandesh Kadur and Kamaljit S. Bawa. The book contains information about the biodiversity of the Eastern Himalayas and is divided into four main chapters, The Land, The People, The Animals, The Plants.

The book aims at capturing the biodiversity and the culture of the eastern Himalayan region by documenting behaviors and rarely photographed species. It is a sequel to Sahyadris, India’s Western Ghats.

References

External links
 
Prerna Bindra Review - Himalaya: Mountains Of Life
 Himalaya : Mountains of Life on Google Books

Coffee table books
Books about the Himalayas